is a passenger railway station in located in the city of  Wakayama, Wakayama Prefecture, Japan, operated by the private railway company Wakayama Electric Railway.

Lines
Okazakimae Station is served by the Kishigawa Line, and is located 5.4 kilometers from the terminus of the line at Wakayama Station.

Station layout
The station consists of one island platform with a level crossing. There is no station building and the station is unattended.

Adjacent stations

History
Okazakimae Station opened on February 15, 1916.

Passenger statistics

Surrounding Area
Wakayama Municipal Higashi Junior High School
Wakayama Prefectural Wakayama Higashi High School
Wakayama Shin-Ai Women's Junior College

See also
List of railway stations in Japan

References

External links
 
  Okazakimae Station timetable

Railway stations in Japan opened in 1916
Railway stations in Wakayama Prefecture
Wakayama (city)